NVC is an abbreviation for:

 National Visa Center, a center that is part of the U.S. Department of State that holds immigrant visa petitions till they can be processed and then arranges for a visa interview for the beneficiaries of the petition.
 National Vegetation Classification, two different systems for classifying natural vegetation:
NVC, the British National Vegetation Classification
NVC or USNVC, the U.S. National Vegetation Classification
NVC, the Nepal Volunteers Council
 Nonviolent Communication
 Nonverbal communication
 National Vocabulary Championship, a United States children's vocabulary competition
 Northwest Vista College, a community college in San Antonio, Texas
New vogue children, album by Japanese electronica duo Schwarz Stein
 Nissan Vanette Cargo, a van produced by Nissan